The Second Coming of Steve Jobs is an unauthorized biography chronicling the life of Steve Jobs, a co-founder of Apple Inc by Vanity Fair magazine writer Alan Deutschman. It covers his period at NeXT, success at Pixar and his comeback to Apple followed by the introduction of iMac.

References

External links
Presentation by Deutschman on The Second Coming of Steve Jobs, November 6, 2000

2000 non-fiction books
Books about Steve Jobs
Unauthorized biographies
Random House books